This is a List of Old Mancunians, former pupils of Manchester Grammar School, in Manchester, England.

Scientists
John Polanyi FRS (born 1929) Chemist  Nobel Prize for Chemistry 1986
Sir Walter Bodmer FRS (born 1936) Geneticist
David Ish-Horowicz FRS (born 1948) Developmental Biologist
Stephen Furber FRS CBE (born 1953) Computer Scientist
Frederick William Gamble FRS (1869-1926) Zoologist
Laurence Pearl FRS (born 1956) Structural Biologist and Biochemist
Merton Sandler (1926-2014) professor of chemical pathology and pioneer in biological psychiatry
 Sir Algernon Thomas FRSNZ KCMG (1857-1937) professor of natural history, Auckland University College (1883-1913)
Frederic Kipping, discoverer of Silicon Polymers, studied at the University of Manchester.
Michael Barber FRS (1934–1991) was a chemist and mass spectrometrist.

Mathematicians
Henry Clarke (died 1818), mathematics teacher in Manchester, Salford and Liverpool.
Sir Michael Francis Atiyah (born 1929) is a prolific geometer who studied at the school for two years as preparation for Cambridge. He went on to attain a Fields Medal, the Abel Prize and the Order of Merit, as well as the positions of President of the Royal Society and Master of Trinity, his former college.
Clifford Cocks and Malcolm J. Williamson were peers at the school and also Maths students at Cambridge. They achieved silver and gold medals respectively  at the 1968 IMO in Moscow while studying at MGS. They both went on to become cryptographers at GCHQ, a British intelligence agency, dealing with security of communications. While both made their own contributions to cryptography in the mid 70s, their results were considered national secrets and when they were discovered independently (about four years later in both cases) they received no credit for their work. It was only in 1997 that GCHQ chose to reveal their achievements. Clifford Cocks had developed RSA encryption, used in all online commerce, but named after the three men who first published the work; likewise, Malcolm J. Williamson had developed what is now known as Diffie–Hellman key exchange, a cryptographic key-agreement protocol, named after the original publishers of the work.
Jonathan Mestel (born 1957) is an applied mathematician at Imperial College who works on magnetohydrodynamics and biological fluid dynamics. He was the first person to be awarded chess International Grandmaster titles by FIDE in both over-the-board play and problem solving.
John Frankland Rigby (1933–2014) was an academic at Cardiff University, a specialist in complex analysis
Edmund Taylor Whittaker (1873–1956) also went on to study at Trinity settling at Edinburgh to make significant contributions to Mathematical Physics.

Politicians

Members of Parliament

Richard Pepper Arden, 1st Baron Alvanley, Master of the Rolls from 1788 to 1790 and MP for Hastings from 1790 to 1794.
Frank Allaun was MP for Salford East from 1955 to 1983
Den Dover, Conservative MP for Chorley from 1979 to 1997.
Stanley Fink, Baron Fink - Life Peer appointed in 2011
Neil Gerrard MP for Walthamstow from 1992 to 2010
John Leech MP for Manchester Withington from 2005
Harold Lever (1914–95) was a Labour Party politician and Chancellor of the Duchy of Lancaster as well as Paymaster General. He received the Order of Merit
Sir Frank Lockwood Q.C. (1846–97) from 1863 to 1865, Liberal Member of Parliament for York 1885-1897 and Solicitor General 1894.
Tom Normanton was MP for Cheadle from 1970 to 1987
Alex Norris, MP for Nottingham North elected in 2017
Michael Winstanley was MP for Cheadle from 1966–70 and for Hazel Grove in 1974

Members of the European Parliament
Den Dover, former MEP for the North West Region

Cricketers
Michael Atherton captained the English cricket team 54 times in the mid nineties, which then included fellow Old Mancunian John Crawley.
Mark Chilton is a former captain of Lancashire
John Crawley (Lancashire and Hampshire)
Mark Lawrence (Oxford University)
Gordon McKinna (Oxford University and Combined Services)
Scott Richardson (Yorkshire)
Gary Yates is the Second Team coach for Lancashire

Writers

Donald Adamson (born 1939), Fellow of the Royal Society of Literature, historian and biographer 
William Harrison Ainsworth (1805–1882) Author of popular historical romances
Samuel Ogden Andrew (1868-1952) Headmaster, translator of Homer, and Old English scholar
Robert Bolt (1924–1995) Playwright; mostly remembered for A Man for All Seasons, for which he received one of his two Academy Awards
Harold Brighouse (1882–1958) Novelist and playwright; together with Stanley Houghton and Allan Monkhouse a member of the Manchester School of early 20th-century dramatists. Author of Hobson's Choice 
Gilbert Cannan (1884–1955) Novelist and translator
Brian Clegg (born 1955) Author of popular science books
Alan Garner (born 1934) Children's author after whom the school's Junior Library is named. He was the first member of his family to go to a secondary school and received a full scholarship. Whilst there he was a keen sprinter
Paul Harrison (pantheist) Founder of the World Pantheist Movement. Award-winning author of six books on environment and world poverty including the international bestseller Inside the Third World (Penguin 1979–1993)
Thomas Kibble Hervey (1799–1859) Poet and critic
Stanley Houghton (1881–1913) Playwright; together with Harold Brighouse and Allan Monkhouse a member of the Manchester School of early 20th-century dramatists. Hindle Wakes is his best-known play.
Thomas Tendron Jeans (18711938), a Royal Navy medical officer who wrote juvenile fiction to show boys what life in the modern navy was really like.
Stephen Leather, thriller writer
Frank McEachran (1900–1975), translator and writer on philosophy
Lance Parkin (born 1971) Author and scriptwriter
Thomas de Quincey (1785–1859) Author and intellectual
Derek Senior, planning correspondent for the Manchester Guardian
Martin Sixsmith (born 1954) Author, journalist and radio/television presenter
Guy Thorne pseudonym of Cyril Arthur Edward Justice Waggoner Ranger Gull (1876–1923) Journalist and novelist
Michael Wood (born 1948), Fellow of the Royal Historical Society and broadcaster
Lawrence Lever Journalist and editor for The Times. Founder of Citywire.

Musicians
 Graham Clark, improvising violinist
 Greg Morris, assistant organist at Temple Church and conductor
 John Ogdon, pianist

Comedians
 Chris Addison
 Laurence Howarth

Others

 Academic Alan Bookbinder, administrator and, latterly, Master of Downing College
 Actors George Coulouris, Sir Ben Kingsley, Robert Powell and Ashley Margolis
 Artist Thomas Cantrell Dugdale, John Mansbridge (1901–1981), World War II official war artist and Head of Fine Art at Goldsmiths College
 Arts Manager Alex Beard (arts manager)
 Aviator Howard Pixton, winner of the 1914 Schneider Trophy
 Broadcasters James H. Reeve, Mark Chapman
 Businessman and politician Lord Woolton
 Chemists Frederick Kipping (1863–1949), developer of silicone compounds, John Charles Polanyi (born 1929), Nobel Prize winner for Chemistry, Herbert Brereton Baker, and Sir James Baddiley FRS FRSE (1918–2008) biochemist
 Civil servant John Swanwick Bradbury, 1st Baron Bradbury
 Chief Executive of Arsenal Football Club, Ivan Gazidis
 Classical scholar A. A. Long
 Clergyman and politician, Rev. Joseph Diggle
 Diplomat Leigh Turner
 Diplomat Sir John Hanson
 Director of the London School of Economics and former Chairman of the Financial Services Authority, Lord Davies
 Doctors Rangan Chatterjee, David Oliver. Former Older Peoples Tsar in the Department of Health, President of British Geriatrics Society. Senior Visiting Fellow at the King's Fund, Professor at City University, London.
 Economist Paul Ormerod
 Fashion designer, theatrical director and stylist William Baker known for his work with Kylie Minogue
 Footballer Oliver Gill
 Hedge Fund entrepreneur Stanley Fink
 Historians Donald Adamson, Michael Wood, Victor G Kiernan
 Richard Hollins Murray, inventor of the reflective lens (the inspiration for cat's eyes used in road markings), owner and restorer of Dinmore Manor, Herefordshire.
 Journalists Dominic Carman, Michael Crick, Faisal Islam, Alexander Gault MacGowan, Tim Samuels and Jim White
 Judge Sir Robert Booth (judge)
 Judge Sir Charles Mantell
 Master of University College, Oxford, Sir Ivor Martin Crewe
 Musicologist, critic and actor Christopher Webber
 Opera and theatre director Steven Pimlott
 Poets Samuel Bamford and Mobeen Altaf  
 Principal of King's College London, Sir Ernest Barker
 Principal of Brasenose College, Classical Scholar Alan Bowman
 Psychologist and philosopher Daniel Berlyne
 Theatre and film director Nicholas Hytner
 Theatre director and Shakespearian academic Ben Iden Payne
 Vice-Chancellor of the University of York, Professor Brian Cantor
 Victoria Cross recipient, William Thomas Forshaw was a teacher at the school
 Leon Simon, President of the Hebrew University of Jerusalem
 Simon Walsh, Barrister and Alderman of the City of London
 Joseph Wood, headmaster of Tonbridge School and Harrow School

References

 01
Lists of people by English school affiliation
Manchester-related lists